Klaus Seelos (born 10 September 1969) is an Austrian bobsledder. He competed at the 2002 Winter Olympics and the 2006 Winter Olympics.

References

1969 births
Living people
Austrian male bobsledders
Olympic bobsledders of Austria
Bobsledders at the 2002 Winter Olympics
Bobsledders at the 2006 Winter Olympics
Sportspeople from Tyrol (state)